Wills Eye Hospital is a non-profit eye clinic and hospital in Philadelphia, Pennsylvania. It was established in 1832 and is the oldest continually operating eye-care facility in the United States. It is the ophthalmology residency program for Thomas Jefferson University.

Since 1990, Wills Eye Hospital has consistently been ranked one of the top three ophthalmology hospitals in the United States by U.S. News & World Report and its ophthalmology residency program is considered one of the most competitive residency programs in the world.

History

James Wills Jr., a Quaker merchant, was instrumental in the founding of Wills Eye through his bequest of $116,000 in 1832 to the City of Philadelphia. Wills stipulated that the funds were to be used specifically for the indigent, blind, and lame.  Over the years it evolved into solely an eye hospital.  The first Wills Hospital opened in 1834 on Logan Square at 18th & Race Streets.

Early surgeons at Wills Eye included Isaac Parrish, M.D. and Isaac Hays, MD, George Fox, M.D., and Squier Littell, M.D., who in 1837 wrote "A Manual of Diseases of the Eye." In 1854, Littell also co-edited "A Treatise on Operative Ophthalmic Surgery" with Henry Haynes Walton.

Historic building

The Centennial Building of Wills Eye Hospital was designed by architect John T. Windrim and built in 1931-1932. The front facade features a portico with eight Tuscan order columns. The building is now residential apartments.

It was added to the National Register of Historic Places in 1984.

Medical achievements

Wills Eye has pioneered many techniques in the field of ophthalmology, including:
 Artificial intraocular lens implant (1952), Warren Reese, MD and Turgut Hamdi, MD
 Invention of a vitrectomy machine (1972), Jay Federman, MD
 Artificial retinal implant (2009), Julia Haller, MD, Allen Ho, MD and Carl Regillo, MD

Notable people
 Charles D. Kelman, MD (Wills Eye residency 1956–1960) - father of phacoemulsification and inventor of the cryoprobe
Jerry A. Shields
Carol Shields
George Spaeth
William Tasman
 Santosh G. Honavar

Senior officials
Joseph Bilson, Executive Director, Wills Eye (2007–present)
Julia A. Haller, MD, Ophthalmologist-in-Chief, Wills Eye (2007–present)

References

Sources
Tasman, William. The History of Wills Eye Hospital Lippincott, 2nd edition (1987).

External links

Wills Eye Knowledge Portal

Buildings and structures on the National Register of Historic Places in Philadelphia
Hospital buildings completed in 1932
Hospitals in Philadelphia
1832 establishments in Pennsylvania
Eye hospitals in the United States
Center City, Philadelphia